Cecilie Askeland Mosli (born 30 January 1973) is a Norwegian actress and film director.

Early life 
She attended Kongsbakken High School in Tromsø, but transferred to a high school in Denmark. Afterwards, she and seven classmates began studying at the State Theatre College.

Career 
Her acting career began in the 1990s when she starred in several short films, including a small role in the film Elling. Her most well-known film role came in 2005 when she starred in Pål Sletaune's thriller Naboer. In 2006, she joined the cast for Thomas Kaisers's romantic comedy Miracle, along with Christian Skolmen and Swedish actress Eva Röse.

In 2009, she began acting for the television series ORPS and its movie sequel ORPS - The Movie. In 2010, she participated in the film Kurt Josef Wagle and the Legend of the Fjord Witch. Then, in 2012, she played the mother of Jarle Klepp in the film adaptation of Tore Renberg's novel Kompani Orheim.

In addition to film roles, Mosli was featured on the radio, worked as a voice actor and as a director. She performed roles in the program Hallo week, which voiced the naughty warehouse and in the children's television series Elias. She directed the NRK drama series Mammon in 2013. In 2017 she directed the fifth episode of season fourteen of Grey's Anatomy. She directed and acted in two episodes of Kielergata (2018).

References

External links

1973 births
Living people
20th-century Norwegian actresses
Place of birth missing (living people)
Norwegian film directors
Norwegian women film directors
21st-century Norwegian actresses
Norwegian film actresses
Norwegian radio actresses
Norwegian television actresses
Norwegian voice actresses